LOVE FM  is a radio station based in Belize City, operating since February 14, 1993. It is part of RSV Media Center, whose chairman is Dr. Rene Villanueva, Sr.

It broadcasts family-oriented programs and mature, contemporary style music.

History 
Love FM was the first private radio station to cover the entire nation of Belize.

Love FM guided the nation through the national emergencies brought on by Hurricanes Mitch, Keith, Chantal and Iris. In many villages, especially those in Southern Belize, Love FM's signal was the only one they could receive. An independent survey conducted by British Forces in 2006 showed that despite the fact that there are 36 radio stations in Belize today some 66.6 percent of those surveyed still rely on Love FM during national emergencies such as in Hurricane Dean in 2007.

References

External links
 Website

Radio stations established in 1993
Radio stations in Belize
RSV Media Center
1993 establishments in Belize